Don't Be a Menace to South Central While Drinking Your Juice in the Hood (or simply Don't Be a Menace) is a 1996 American comedy film directed by Paris Barclay in his feature directorial debut and written by Phil Beauman, with additional contributions by and starring Shawn Wayans and Marlon Wayans. In the film, two cousins explore the surreal, comedic world of South Central Los Angeles.

Don't Be a Menace spoofs several 1990s hood films, notably Menace II Society (1993),  South Central, Juice (both 1992), and Boyz n the Hood (1991). It features cameos from actors from those films, often parodying their original roles. Produced by Keenen Ivory Wayans, it is the Wayans' second film to feature a parody of black film culture and African-American society, after I'm Gonna Git You Sucka (1988).

Don't Be a Menace was theatrically released in the United States on January 12, 1996, by Miramax Films. It received mixed to negative reviews from critics but has gained a cult following from audiences. The film grossed $20.1 million worldwide.

Plot 
Ashtray, Tray for short, is sent to the inner city to live with his father. Tray gets an education about life on the streets from his psychotic, gun-toting cousin Loc Dog, pot-smoking foul-mouthed Grandma, underage Pops, and gang members Preach and Crazy Legs. At a picnic, Tray falls for the infamous Dashiki, who has seven kids, much to the distaste of ex-convict Toothpick, who happens to be her ex-boyfriend. When Ashtray and Loc Dog head out to buy some snacks, Toothpick and his crew, Al Dog and Sam, confront Ashtray and hold him at gunpoint until Loc Dog threatens them with a nuclear missile mounted in the back of his truck, whereupon Toothpick and his gang flee the scene.

Loc Dog and Ashtray are harassed in a Korean store by the owners, and Loc Dog shoots at them when they make a remark about his mother. The two are then confronted by "The Man" (a mysterious white government figure), who kills the Koreans and tosses them his gun to frame them and leaves.

Meanwhile, Ashtray and Loc Dog's Grandma ride to church and another elderly woman disses her, resulting in a breakdancing contest that Grandma wins.

Ashtray visits Dashiki where they engage in sexual intercourse and Dashiki immediately claims he has impregnated her. Feeling like he's not responsible enough to be the father, Dashiki kicks him out. Meanwhile, Toothpick and Al Dog jump a new member into their gang by doing Double Dutch jump rope. Afterwards, Sam confronts Ashtray, Loc Dog, Preach, and Crazy Legs about Ashtray impregnating Dashiki. Loc Dog knocks him out as he, Ashtray and Preach proceed to punch & stomp him, flattening him (literally). The quartet decides to get protection from their friend Old School, who advises them to protect themselves and watch out for each other, until his mother walks out and tells him to clean his bedroom.

Moments later, Toothpick performs a drive-by shooting in revenge for Sam's beating and Crazy Legs is injured. With Crazy Legs hospitalized, Tray decides to confront Dashiki and become a father to their newborn baby. Dashiki agrees to give Tray another chance and they decide to leave the ‘hood as planned.

Ashtray then reads a bedtime story to his Pops (who is too young to go to a party) which causes him to ejaculate before going to sleep. At the party, Loc Dog meets Keisha, whom he then takes to his mail truck for drinks and sex, during which Keisha turns into a demonic monster and attacks Loc Dog, stripping him naked while he tries to run away screaming.

Ashtray and Loc Dog talk about Ashtray's departure as Toothpick and his gang prepare for another drive-by shooting. As Toothpick and Loc Dog clash, Ashtray is shot. As Loc Dog and Toothpick's gang continue to exchange gunfire, Grandma pops out of the dumpster and helps Loc Dog shoot at the Toothpick's car, with both of them shooting Al Dog and Sam, then flattening a tire, causing Toothpick to be flung from the car, landing on a cop car. Preach and Dashiki find Ashtray hurt, and he regains consciousness and kisses Dashiki. A woman finds Toothpick (she turns out to be his mother) and beats him with his shoe for stealing from her in the past. Afterwards, Toothpick and his gang are presumably arrested.

Afterwards, everyone goes their separate ways: Ashtray and Dashiki marry and enjoy their lives, Loc Dog becomes the host of Death Comedy Jam (a parody of Def Comedy Jam) and opens and closes the show with extreme profanity, Preach and his crush settle down together, Crazy Legs becomes a dancer as he had always dreamed, and Grandma is, as Ashtray puts it, "still Grandma" (showing her smoking cannabis).

Cast
 Shawn Wayans as Ashtray, the everyman, trying to make his way through a confusing world, is sent by his mother to live in the ghetto where his father might teach him how to become a man. Based on Tre Styles from Boyz n the Hood, Bobby Johnson from South Central, and Caine Lawson from Menace II Society.
 Vivica A. Fox as Ashtray's mother, whose one-scene, one-line cameo at the beginning ends with her son asking, "So will I see you again?" and her replying, "Sorry baby. You know there ain't no positive black females in these movies". Based on Reva Devereaux-Styles from Boyz n the Hood.
 Lahmard Tate as Ashtray's father, Ashtray's temperamental role model who dispenses sage advice to his son. According to Ashtray, he is only "a couple years older than I am", although some references were made to Ashtray possibly being older than he was, such as Ashtray attending a party that his father is not old enough to attend. Based on Furious Styles from Boyz n the Hood.
 Marlon Wayans as Loc Dog: Ashtray's cousin and gangsta/drug dealer/criminal. He drives a USPS delivery truck which is loaded in the back with ballistics, including a nuclear weapon. Based on O-Dog from Menace II Society, Lucky from Poetic Justice and Doughboy from Boyz n the Hood.
 Helen Martin as Grandma, Ashtray and Loc Dog's grandmother; a marijuana-smoking, foul-mouthed, church-going woman. Based on Delilah Benson from Dead Presidents.
 Chris Spencer as Preach, Ashtray's friend and former gang member turned "politically conscious" activist, resembling a Nation of Islam member, but is now just "confused"; he has a fetish for white girls. Based on Sharif from Menace II Society and Ali from South Central.
 Suli McCullough as Crazy Legs: Ashtray's friend; was paralyzed in a drive-by. Has a dream to be a professional dancer. Based on Chris from Boyz n the Hood.
 Tracey Cherelle Jones as Dashiki, the object of Ashtray's affections. A "hood mother" with seven kids by seven different men. Dashiki's address is 6969 Penetration Avenue. Based on Ronnie from Menace II Society and Justice from Poetic Justice and Brandi from Boyz n the Hood.
 Isaiah Barnes as Doo Rag: Dashiki's oldest son and the only one of her kids who has more than one line of dialogue. He pulls a gun on Ashtray after losing a video game. When he admits he learned about guns from "cartoons and 'hood movies'", Ashtray passionately declares that he and Doo Rag are an endangered species—not because their lives are in danger, but because "rappers are taking all the good acting jobs!". The kid rolls his eyes as Ashtray lectures him about the values of education. Based on Anthony from Menace II Society.
 Darrell Heath as Toothpick, Dashiki's ex-boyfriend, who was just released from prison and still acts like he's incarcerated. He swears he will kill Ashtray for romancing Dashiki. Based on Ferris from Boyz N the Hood and Ilena's Cousin from Menace II Society.
 Antonio Fargas as Old School, an OG associate of Ashtray and his group.
 Bernie Mac as Officer Self Hatred, a cop who harasses Ashtray and Loc Dog. As he has Ashtray pinned against his squad car, he goes on and on about how much he hates black people and anything black. Based on Officer Coffey from Boyz n the Hood.
 Terri J. Vaughn as Keisha: A possessed woman that Loc Dog met at the late night party and takes to the cargo hold of his truck. While proceeding to have sex with her, she morphs into a demonic version of herself and proceeds to force Loc Dog to have sex with her. It is unknown what happened after this. Based on Abby, the title character of a 1974 blaxploitation horror film about a woman who is possessed by an African sex spirit.
 Benjamin N. Everitt as The Man, a pale white man with red hair and glasses, who systematically robs a convenience store while the Korean owners are keeping a close, racist eye on Ashtray and Loc Dog and completely ignore his crimes. When Loc Dog is firing his gun at the owners and not hitting them, The Man fires his gun once and hits a hanging light that falls on the owners and kills them. He then tosses his gun to an unwitting Ashtray and Loc Dog, who mistakenly catch it as he scratches their names off his list of black men whom he's framed for crimes and peels off a single glove (a reference to the O. J. Simpson case).
 Keith Morris as Dave the Crackhead, a drug user apparently going through withdrawal who offers to perform fellatio in return for spare change or directions to a person's house. Based on the nameless "Basehead" character from Menace II Society.
 Keenen Ivory Wayans as The Mailman; he appears various times throughout the film shouting "Message!" whenever a moral lesson is expressed without subtlety in dialogue. At the end of the film, when Loc Dog gives a rambling speech to Ashtray, the Mailman appears, and says, "What the fuck is he talking about?"
Omar Epps as Malik, a parody of his character from Higher Learning, taking place a year after the events of Higher Learning, this movie depicts him returning to school for his Sophomore year, giving hope to both Ashtray & Loc Dog. As soon as the two depart and wish Malik good luck on a new school year, he is shot and killed by a new Skinheads member who then scratches his name off the list of “brothers who are trying to make it out of the hood”.
Lawanda Page as Old School's Mom.

Reception

Box office 
Don't Be a Menace to South Central While Drinking Your Juice in The Hood collected $8,112,884 from 1,010 theaters its opening weekend, opening at #2 at the box office, averaging $8,032 per theater. By the end of its theatrical run, the film domestically grossed $20,109,115.

Critical response 
Rotten Tomatoes gives the film a score of 32% based on 28 reviews.

Chris Hicks of the Deseret News wrote the film has some laughs, "but too many gags fall flat, or are cheap and sleazy instead of clever and witty. Too often, the Wayanses (who also co-wrote the script) make fun of women's physical attributes, mock the handicapped, put a gun to someone's head or have an elderly woman cuss and smoke pot, as if they inherently hilarious. And then the same jokes are repeated in a slightly varied form."

Godfrey Cheshire of Variety said the film has a "genial and capable cast", and is "spirited and hilarious in odd moments", but "it hardly expands on In Living Color and other Wayans precedents, and compared with a genuinely satiric film like Rusty Cundieff’s Fear of a Black Hat, it’s simple parody, with little in the way of ironic commentary or real invention."

Stephen Holden of The New York Times wrote "the film’s most inflammatory comic bit [is when] the suspicious owners of a Korean grocery store trail Ashtray and Loc Dog through the aisles while a white customer casually steals a sack full of items and empties the cash register. On returning to his counter, the owner calls out to the departing robber, 'You forgot something,' and hands over the last remaining bills." 

Bruce Fretts of Entertainment Weekly said "Don't Be a Menace is at its best when puncturing the preachiness of John Singleton's films (big brother Keenen Ivory Wayans appears in a cameo after each weepy, didactic speech to announce, ''Message!'')" and when making pointed jabs about race or culture, but many of the jokes feel "too dopey."

The film has since gone on to earn a cult following.

Soundtrack

The soundtrack album was released on January 9, 1996, via Island Records, and consisted of hip hop and R&B music. The album peaked at number 18 on the Billboard 200, number 3 on the Top R&B/Hip-Hop Albums, and was certified Gold by the Recording Industry Association of America on March 14, 1996, for selling 500,000 copies in the United States.

It spawned five singles: The Island Inspirational All-Stars' gospel song "Don't Give Up", the Lost Boyz' "Renee" and "Can't Be Wasting My Time", Joe's "All the Things (Your Man Won't Do)", and The Isley Brothers' "Let's Lay Together".

See also 
 List of hood films

References

External links

 
 
 
 

1996 directorial debut films
1996 comedy films
1996 films
1990s crime comedy films
1990s gang films
1990s parody films
African-American comedy films
American black comedy films
American crime comedy films
American films about revenge
American gang films
American independent films
1996 independent films
American parody films
American satirical films
1990s English-language films
Films about race and ethnicity
Films about racism in the United States
Films directed by Paris Barclay
Hood comedy films
Stoner films
1990s American films
African-American films